Miss Teenager South Africa also known as MTSA is a beauty pageant in South Africa that was formed in 2018 for female models aged between 14 years and 19 years.

The current Miss Teenager South Africa is Khanyisile B Mahlangu who was crowned in July of 2022. The pageant winner becomes an ambassador for teenagers across South Africa. Entry into the pageant is through applications on the Miss Teenager South Africa website.

Titleholders
This is a list of women who have won the Miss Teenager South Africa beauty pageant.

References

Beauty pageants for youth
Youth events